Chelly may refer to:

 Canyon de Chelly, a canyon in Arizona
 Battle of Canyon de Chelly, a battle in the canyon
 Canyon de Chelly National Monument, a U.S. National Monument
 A. H. Halsey (1923–2014), nicknamed Chelly, British sociologist
 Jacques E. Chelly, academic specializing in anesthesiology and acute pain management

People 
 Chelly (performer), American Actor and Musician from Never Have I Ever on Netflix

See also
 Chelli (disambiguation)